Modris Eksteins (born December 13, 1943) is a Latvian Canadian historian with a special interest in German history and modern culture.

Born in Riga, Latvia, his works include Rites of Spring: The Great War and the Birth of the Modern Age (1989), which won the Wallace K. Ferguson Prize and the Trillium Book Award. Walking Since Daybreak: A Story of Eastern Europe, World War II and the Heart of Our Century (1999), which juxtaposes the history of World War II and Latvia with personal memoir, and won the Pearson Writers' Trust Non-Fiction Prize, and Solar Dance: Genius, Forgery, and the Eclipse of Certainty (2012), which seeks to interpret the enormous posthumous success of Vincent van Gogh and discusses his forger Otto Wacker, and won the 2013 British Columbia National Award for Canadian Non-Fiction.  His work has been translated into German, French, Dutch, Spanish, Portuguese, Polish, Czech, Latvian, Japanese, Korean, and Chinese.

After emigrating to Canada as a child, Eksteins, son of a Baptist minister, settled first in Winnipeg and then in Toronto, where he attended Upper Canada College on scholarship and then the University of Toronto (Trinity College) from which he graduated with a BA in 1965. Meanwhile, he attained a Diploma from Heidelberg University in 1963. He then studied at Oxford University (St. Antony's College) as a Rhodes Scholar, earning his BPhil in 1967, and DPhil in 1970. He joined the Division of Humanities at University of Toronto Scarborough in 1970, retiring as professor emeritus of history in 2010.

Works 
 Theodor Heuss und die Weimarer Republik (1969), Ernst Klett Verlag
 The Limits of Reason: The German Democratic Press and the Collapse of Weimar Democracy (1975), Oxford University Press, 
 Nineteenth-Century Germany (1983), Gunter Narr Verlag, co-editor
 Rites of Spring: The Great War and the Birth of the Modern Age (1989), Houghton Mifflin, 
 Walking Since Daybreak: A Story of Eastern Europe, World War II and the Heart of Our Century (1999), Houghton Mifflin, 
 Diaghilev Was Here (2005), Diaghilev Festival Foundation, co-author
 Solar Dance: Genius, Forgery, and the Eclipse of Certainty (2012), Knopf Canada,

Notes

External links

 Interview on CBC Ideas, November 29, 2012
Modris Eksteins on History Today

1943 births
Living people
20th-century Canadian historians
Canadian male non-fiction writers
Latvian emigrants to Canada
Latvian World War II refugees
Historians of Germany
Cultural historians
Upper Canada College alumni
Trinity College (Canada) alumni
University of Toronto alumni
Alumni of St Antony's College, Oxford
Canadian Rhodes Scholars
Academic staff of the University of Toronto
21st-century Canadian historians